Utricularia heterochroma is a very small, possibly perennial, rheophytic carnivorous plant that belongs to the genus Utricularia. U. heterochroma is endemic to Venezuela, where it is known from the type location at Ptari-tepui, two collections from Toronó-tepui, one collection from Apacará-tepui, one collection from Serrania Guanay, and several collections from the Chimantá Massif. It was originally described and published by Julian Alfred Steyermark in 1953.

See also 
 List of Utricularia species

References 

Carnivorous plants of South America
Flora of Venezuela
heterochroma
Flora of the Tepuis